Ian Mellor (born 19 February 1950) is an English former professional footballer. He was born in Sale, England.

Mellor, a left-winger, began his career with Manchester City. He played as a substitute as City won the 1972 FA Charity Shield. He then moved to Norwich City in 1973 for a fee of £65,000. The Canaries were struggling against relegation in their first season in English football's top division when Mellor joined. He played in the last eleven league games of the season and played his part in helping the club stay up. He went on to score nine goals in 43 games for Norwich before playing for Brighton where he was known as "Spider". and then in February 1978 moving for £25,000 to Chester, He helped Chester finish fifth in Division Three in his first season and was on target in a Football League Cup giantkilling against First Division side Coventry City early in 1978–79.

At the end of the season Mellor moved to Sheffield Wednesday, securing a place in Wednesday history by scoring in the 4–0 defeat of Sheffield United, in the famous 'Boxing Day Massacre', here he remained until joining Bradford City in June 1982. He also played briefly in Hong Kong for Tung Sing. He spent two seasons with City before ending his professional career.

Mellor is the father of former Liverpool striker Neil Mellor, and second cousin to Louise Dalton.

References

Ian Mellor, Post War English & Scottish Football League A - Z Player's Transfer Database

Notes

1950 births
Living people
English footballers
People from Sale, Greater Manchester
Manchester City F.C. players
Norwich City F.C. players
Brighton & Hove Albion F.C. players
Chester City F.C. players
Kiveton Park F.C. players
Sheffield Wednesday F.C. players
Bradford City A.F.C. players
English Football League players
Association football wingers